was a town located in Nishikasugai District, Aichi Prefecture, Japan.

As of 2003, the town has an estimated population of 43,299 and a density of 5,160.79 persons per km². The total area is 8.39 km².

On March 20, 2006, Shikatsu, along with the town of Nishiharu (also Nishikasugai District), was merged to create the city of Kitanagoya.

External links
 Kitanagoya official website 

Dissolved municipalities of Aichi Prefecture
Kitanagoya, Aichi